Xinmin Weekly, literally meaning "New People Weekly", or "New Citizen Weekly", is a weekly news magazine published in Shanghai, China. It is owned by the Shanghai United Media Group. The magazine was officially launched on January 4, 1999.

References

External links
 Official website of Xinmin Weekly
 Official website of Xinmin Weekly

1999 establishments in China
Chinese-language magazines (Simplified Chinese)
Magazines established in 1999
Magazines published in Shanghai
News magazines published in Asia
Weekly magazines published in China
Weekly news magazines